The Huntington Baronetcy, of Clock House in the Metropolitan Borough of Chelsea, was a title in the Baronetage of the United Kingdom. It was created on 20 July 1906 for Charles Huntington, previously Liberal Member of Parliament for Darwen. The title became extinct on the death of the third Baronet in 1928.

Huntington baronets, of Clock House (1906)
Sir Charles Philip Huntington, 1st Baronet (1833–1906)
Sir Henry Leslie Huntington, 2nd Baronet (1885–1907)
Sir Charles Philip Huntington, 3rd Baronet (1888–1928). He left no heir.

Notes

References
 

Extinct baronetcies in the Baronetage of the United Kingdom